Retallack village is near St Columb Major, in Cornwall, England, UK, and in the civil parish of St Wenn. Most of the village was turned into a 100 acre commercial theme park called "Spirit of the West". The theme park was closed in 2009 and redeveloped into holiday lodges which use the name Retallack Resort & Spa.

Outer Retallick (sic) is another village 1 km to the northwest of the village of Winnards Perch, which was destroyed to make way for a nearby highway roundabout.

Retallack is also a Cornish surname. The name can be traced back to the location near St Columb. John Retallack, listed as a local farmer living at Retallack in 1602. Other Cornish localities named for this family include Retillick Farm (sic) near Roche (SW 974593), Retallack Farm near Constantine (SW 733304), and Retallack Mine near Millpool (SW 573314) Other Cornish places called Retallack also exist: these are in St Hilary and Constantine. while Retallick is in Roche. Though the modern forms are the same the earlier forms show that the original meanings are different. This Retallack and the nearby Retallick have the meaning "ford by willow trees".

References

External links
Retallack Resort & Spa

Villages in Cornwall